Douglas William Domenech is an American government official who served as the Assistant United States Secretary of the Interior for Insular Areas in the Trump administration from 2017 to 2021. He is a former a George W. Bush administration political appointee who served in roles of Deputy Chief of Staff of the United States Department of the Interior, and Senior Advisor to the Secretary of the Interior, as well as held a position on the White House Working Group on the Political Status of Puerto Rico.

A probe by the Interior Department's Inspector General concluded that Domenech had in 2017 misused his office for personal gain by getting the EPA to hire his son-in-law. Investigators also said that Domenech had used his office to promote another family member's business.

Early life and education
Born August 5, 1955, in Georgia, Douglas W. Domenech grew up in a military family of Puerto Rican descent and lived in Panama, the Dominican Republic, and the family's native island of Puerto Rico as a child. His father, John Domenech, served in the Army for 30 years and retired as a colonel. Domenech graduated from Antilles High School at Fort Buchanan, Puerto Rico, in 1973 and earned a B.S. in forestry and wildlife management at Virginia Tech in 1978. He is the father of blogger and columnist Ben Domenech, who is married to Meghan McCain, a daughter of the late Senator John McCain.

Career
Doug Domenech served in the George W. Bush administration in the Department of the Interior as White House Liaison and as Deputy Chief of Staff.

From 2010 to 2014, Domenech served as Governor Bob McDonnell's Secretary of Natural Resources of the Commonwealth of Virginia, making him the first Hispanic and Puerto Rican person to be appointed to McDonnell's cabinet. Domenech previously worked for the Forest Resources Association.

From March 2015, Domenech was director of the Texas Public Policy Foundation's Fueling Freedom Project, which was a project to fight the Environmental Protection Agency's Clean Power Plan.

Domenech is the Interior Secretary's representative on the Advisory Committee of the Conservation Trust of Puerto Rico.

Ethics violation investigation
On April 23, 2019, The Washington Post reported that Domenech was one of six officials being investigated for ethics violations by the Interior Department's Office of Inspector General. Domenech was one of six political appointees of the Trump administration at the Interior Department under investigation for having "violated federal ethics rules by engaging with their former employers or clients on department-related business." In 2017 Trump had signed an executive order requiring appointees to recuse themselves for two years on any matters involving their former employers and clients. According to his calendar, on April 6, 2017, Domenech had two meetings with his former employer, the Texas Public Policy Foundation, while the think tank was also a party to lawsuits against the Interior Department. Six months later, one of the lawsuits was settled by the government. Domenech's ethics violation was first uncovered by The Guardian newspaper and later confirmed by the Interior Department's Inspector General.

References

1955 births
Living people
American politicians of Puerto Rican descent
United States Department of the Interior officials
State cabinet secretaries of Virginia
Virginia Tech alumni
Virginia Republicans
George W. Bush administration personnel
Trump administration personnel